Valley Vipers may refer to:

Science:
Montivipera latifii, a venomous viper species endemic in Iran

Sports:
Rio Grande Valley Vipers, a team in the NBA Development League
Chattahoochee Valley Vipers, a former team in the American Indoor Football Association
Roanoke Valley Vipers, a former team in the Southern Professional Hockey League
Tennessee Valley Vipers, a professional arena football team in the now-defunct AF2 development league
Valley Vipers, a minor league team based in Scottsdale, Arizona, that played in the Western Baseball League in 2000